Linsey Macdonald (born 14 February 1964) is a former Scottish sprinter from Dunfermline, Fife, who specialised in the 400 metres. She was nicknamed "The Fife Flyer" during her career. Inspired by competitors like Mary Peters she started in athletics at the age of 10.

Athletics career 
In 1978 Macdonald was a successful schoolgirl runner, where she was British School Girl Champion in the 100m. She moved up to be a successful junior runner winning the AAA indoor 60m championship, she then added the Junior indoor 400m a year later.

Her success continued when she won the AAA Junior Championships in the 100m and 400m in 1979, and 100m and 200m in 1980. Also in 1980 she was AAA indoor 200m champion, as well as U.K. Champion in the 400m.

Still at 16 years old Macdonald went with the British team to the 1980 Summer Olympics in Moscow, after setting a British Junior 400m record of 51.16 seconds, which still stands. In Moscow she qualified for the Olympic final, finishing 8th in 52.40 seconds. She was a member of the 4x400 metre relay team that won the Olympic bronze medal.

In 1981 she won the Scottish and the U.K. 100m and 200m Championships, then won a bronze medal at the European Junior Championships.

She represented Scotland at the 1982 Commonwealth Games in Brisbane and won a bronze medal with the 4x400m relay team. However, she was eliminated in the heats of the Athens European Championships in 1982. Coached until the age of 18 by Jimmy Brice, she was subsequently coached by John Anderson but never bettered her time of 51.16s at a 16-year-old.

In 1985 she won the Scottish 400m metres championship, and the AAA Indoor 400m title.

She was a member of Pitreavie Amateur Athletic Club, and still holds several club records.

Career and personal life 
Macdonald has degrees in chemical engineering and medicine from the University of Edinburgh and is a general practitioner with a special interest in sport medicine in Hong Kong. She is married to Christopher Tong, an orthopaedic surgeon and has two sons, Hamish and Fergus.

References

1964 births
Living people
Scottish female sprinters
Sportspeople from Dunfermline
Olympic athletes of Great Britain
Commonwealth Games medallists in athletics
Athletes (track and field) at the 1980 Summer Olympics
Athletes (track and field) at the 1982 Commonwealth Games
Athletes (track and field) at the 1986 Commonwealth Games
Alumni of the University of Edinburgh
Medalists at the 1980 Summer Olympics
Olympic bronze medallists for Great Britain
Commonwealth Games bronze medallists for Scotland
Olympic bronze medalists in athletics (track and field)
Scottish Olympic medallists
Olympic female sprinters
Medallists at the 1982 Commonwealth Games